Senator Lance may refer to:

Leonard Lance (born 1952), New Jersey State Senate
Wesley Lance (1908–2007), New Jersey State Senate